The 2019 WSBL season was the 31st season of the Women's State Basketball League (SBL). The regular season began on Friday 15 March, with round 1 seeing a 2018 grand final rematch between the Lakeside Lightning and Mandurah Magic. The 2019 WSBL All-Star Game was played on 3 June at Bendat Basketball Centre – the home of basketball in Western Australia. The regular season ended on Saturday 27 July. The finals began on Friday 2 August and ended on Friday 30 August, when the Rockingham Flames defeated the Warwick Senators in the WSBL Grand Final.

Regular season
The regular season began on Friday 15 March and ended on Saturday 27 July after 20 rounds of competition. Easter games in round 6 were again scheduled for a blockbuster Thursday night, with all teams then on a break over the long weekend. Games tipped-off again on Anzac Day as the tradition continued between the Kalamunda Eastern Suns and Willetton Tigers. There was also Women's Round in round 9 and Heritage Round in round 16, while the new concept of Mental Health Awareness Round was included for round 19.

Changes for the 2019 season saw the Stirling Senators rebrand as the Warwick Senators, while the East Perth Eagles relocated from Morley Sport & Recreation Centre to Herb Graham Recreation Centre.

Standings

Finals
The finals began on Friday 2 August and ended on Friday 30 August with the WSBL Grand Final.

Bracket

All-Star Game
The 2019 WSBL All-Star Game took place at Bendat Basketball Centre on Monday 3 June, with all proceeds going to Red Frogs Australia.

Rosters

Game data

Awards

Player of the Week

Statistics leaders

Regular season
 Most Valuable Player: Stacey Barr (Warwick Senators)
 Coach of the Year: Craig Watts (Mandurah Magic)
 Most Improved Player: Matilda Muir (Cockburn Cougars)
 All-WSBL First Team:
 PG: Lauren Mansfield (Perth Redbacks)
 SG: Stacey Barr (Warwick Senators)
 SF: Laina Snyder (Willetton Tigers)
 PF: Darcee Garbin (Rockingham Flames)
 C: Amber Land (Joondalup Wolves)
 All-Defensive Team:
 PG: Emma Gandini (Willetton Tigers)
 SG: Casey Mihovilovich (Mandurah Magic)
 SF: Desiree Kelley (Willetton Tigers)
 PF: Jennie Rintala (Kalamunda Eastern Suns)
 C: Maddie Allen (Rockingham Flames)

Finals
 Grand Final MVP: Maddie Allen (Rockingham Flames)

References

External links
 2019 fixtures
 2019 season preview
 All-Star starters

2019
2018–19 in Australian basketball
2019–20 in Australian basketball
basketball